Saldula saltatoria  is a Holarctic  shore bug with a circumboreal distribution. It is widespread in central Europe and is the most common of the shore bugs, and often occurs in large numbers.
 
It is an active predator on small invertebrates and lives on fresh water margins , from small water bodies to large lakes and rivers. Saldula saltatoria is also found  at salt water edges  and on high moorland, and also in less humid habitats such as fields and other ruderal habitats. In the Alps it rises about 2000 meters above sea level.

References 

 Ekkehard Wachmann, Albert Melber, Jürgen Deckert: Wanzen. Band 1: Cimicomorpha: Dipsocoromorpha, Nepomorpha, Gerromorpha, Leptopodomorpha, Cimicomorpha (Teil 1) (= Die Tierwelt Deutschlands und der angrenzenden Meeresteile nach ihren Merkmalen und nach ihrer Lebensweise. 77. Teil). Goecke & Evers, Keltern 2006, .

External links 
 British Bugs

Hemiptera of Europe
Insects described in 1758
Taxa named by Carl Linnaeus
Saldoidini